Ussara decoratella is a species of sedge moth in the genus Ussara. It was described by Francis Walker in 1864. It is found in Brazil.

References

Moths described in 1864
Glyphipterigidae